The Nepal cricket team toured Malaysia in July 2019 to play a two-match Twenty20 International (T20I) series. The fixtures were part of both teams' preparation for the Asian Regional Qualifying Finals tournament for the 2019 ICC T20 World Cup Qualifier. Both matches were played at the Kinrara Oval in Kuala Lumpur. Ahead of the tour, Nepal's captain Paras Khadka named a twenty five-man preliminary squad for the Asian Regional Qualifying Finals, which was trimmed down to the final fourteen players. Nepal won the series 2–0, their first ever series whitewash. Malaysia retained the same squad for Asian Regional Qualifying Finals.

Squads

T20I series

1st T20I

2nd T20I

References

External links
 Series home at ESPN Cricinfo

2019 in Malaysian cricket
2019 in Nepalese cricket
Associate international cricket competitions in 2019
M